Riccardo Magni (born 5 March 1976) is an Italian wrestler. He competed in the men's Greco-Roman 63 kg at the 2000 Summer Olympics.

References

External links
 

1976 births
Living people
Italian male sport wrestlers
Olympic wrestlers of Italy
Wrestlers at the 2000 Summer Olympics
Sportspeople from Padua
Wrestlers of Fiamme Oro